Conrad I (c. 1040 – 8 August 1086) was count of Luxembourg (1059–1086), succeeding his father Giselbert of Luxembourg.

He was embroiled in an argument with the archbishop of Trier as to the abbaye Saint-Maximin in Trier which he had avowed. The archbishop excommunicated him and Conrad had to make honourable amends and set out on pilgrimage for Jerusalem to have his excommunication lifted. He died in Italy on the return journey.

He founded the Orval Abbey in 1070 with Count Arnold I of Chiny and the Altmünster Abbey in 1083.

Marriage and issue 
Around 1075 he married Clementia (1060–1142), daughter of Duke William VII of Aquitaine and of Ermesinde. They had:
 Matilda (1070 † ), married Godefroy (1075 † ), Count of Bleisgau
 Henry III († 1096), Count of Luxembourg
 Rudolph († 1099), abbot of Saint-Vannes at Verdun
 Conrad, cité en 1080
 Adalbero, (d. 1098 in Antioch), Archdeacon of Metz, travelled to the Holy Land as part of the army of Godfrey of Bouillon, where he was executed by the Turks
 Ermesinde (1075 † 1143), married
 in 1096 to Albert II († 1098), count of Egisheim and of Dagsbourg,
 in 1101 to Godefroy (1067 † 1139), count of Namur. They were parents of Henry IV of Luxembourg
 William I (1081 † 1131), Count of Luxembourg, married Matilda of Beichlingen

References

Sources

1040s births
1086 deaths
Year of birth uncertain
People temporarily excommunicated by the Catholic Church

Counts of Luxembourg
House of Luxembourg